Rana Gurdan Saini was a rajput  military general who died in a battle between the Turk forces of Jalal ud din Firuz Khalji and the Chahamana forces of Hammiradeva in the 14th century CE.

Career
According to Kishori Lal, "Saini was a great general and had led several expeditions into the country of Malwa and Gujarat." He was killed in battle. The historians Henry Miers Elliot and John Dowson cite Miftah al-Futuh, a work by Amir Khusro, who describes Gurdan Saini in the  Rajput army of Rana Hamir:

References

14th-century Indian people
14th-century soldiers